Severo-Vostochnyy Strait (Russian: Proliv Severo-Vostochnyy or "Northeast Strait") is a strait in the western Sea of Okhotsk. It separates Bolshoy Shantar Island to the north from Malyy Shantar Island to the south. It is divided in two by several rocks that rise to 15 to 18 m (50 to 60 ft) and has reefs extending from both sides. It also has swift tidal currents, with the flood setting to the west and the ebb to the east.

History

American boat crews searching for bowhead whales sometimes used the strait, though the ships themselves seldom entered it. They called it Rocky Passage.

References

Straits of Russia
Bodies of water of the Sea of Okhotsk
Bodies of water of Khabarovsk Krai